The 2004 United States elections were held on November 2. Republican President George W. Bush won re-election and Republicans retained control of Congress.

Democratic Senator John Kerry of Massachusetts won his party's nomination after defeating Senator John Edwards and several other candidates in the 2004 Democratic presidential primaries. In the general election, Bush won 286 of the 538 electoral votes and 50.7 percent of the popular vote. Foreign policy was the dominant theme throughout the election campaign, particularly Bush's conduct of the War on Terrorism and the 2003 invasion of Iraq.

Riding Bush's coattails, the Republicans picked up net gains of four Senate seats and three House seats. In the gubernatorial elections, neither party won a net gain of seats. Bush became the first President since Ronald Reagan in 1980 to see his party gain seats in both Houses of Congress during a Presidential election year. Republicans would not win another trifecta until 2016.

As of 2020, this is the last time the incumbent party retained control over the presidency and Congress after a single term. It is the only election cycle since 1928 in which a Republican trifecta was successfully maintained, as well as the first time since the 1950 and 1952 elections that the Republicans gained seats in consecutive elections.

Federal elections

President

Republican incumbent President George W. Bush was re-elected, defeating Democratic Senator John Kerry from Massachusetts.

United States Senate

The 34 seats in the United States Senate Class 3 were up for election. Republicans had a net gain of 4 seats.

United States House of Representatives

Republicans gained a couple of seats in the House, mainly due to the 2003 Texas redistricting. Republicans won the national popular vote for the House of Representatives by a margin of 2.6 percentage points.

State elections

Governors

Eleven of the fifty United States governors were up for re-election, as were the governorships of two U.S. territories. The final results were a net change of zero between the political parties. The Democrats picked up the governorships in Montana and New Hampshire, but the Republicans picked up the ones in Indiana and Missouri.

Other statewide elections 
In many states where if the following positions were elective offices, voters cast votes for candidates for state executive branch offices of Lieutenant Governor (though some were voted for on the same ticket as the gubernatorial nominee), Secretary of state, state Treasurer, state Auditor, state Attorney General, state Superintendent of Education, Commissioners of Insurance, Agriculture or, Labor, etc.) and state judicial branch offices (seats on state Supreme Courts and, in some states, state appellate courts).

State legislative elections

Initiatives and referendums

 State constitutional amendments prohibiting same-sex marriage are passed in eleven states: Arkansas, Georgia, Kentucky, Michigan, Mississippi, Montana, North Dakota, Ohio, Oklahoma, Oregon, and Utah. The measures in Oregon, Mississippi, and Montana bans same-sex marriage only, while Arkansas, Georgia, Kentucky, North Dakota, Oklahoma, Ohio, and Utah bans both same-sex marriage and civil unions and Michigan bans granting any benefits whatsoever to same-sex couples.

Local elections

Mayoral elections
Some of the major American cities that held their mayoral elections in 2004 included:
Chesapeake – Dalton S. Edge won an open seat race to succeed outgoing Mayor William E. Ward.
Jersey City- In a special election triggered due to the passing of Glenn Cunningham (D), attorney Jerramiah Healy (D) defeated General Assemblyman Louis Manzo (D) and Acting Mayor L. Harvey Smith (D) to serve the rest of the unexpired term.
San Diego – Incumbent Mayor Dick Murphy (R) was re-elected, but resigned five months later.

Notes

References

Further reading
 Ceaser, James W. and Andrew E. Busch. Red Over Blue: The 2004 Elections and American Politics (2005), narrative history.
 Greene, John C. and Mark J. Rozell, eds. The Values Campaign?: The Christian Right and the 2004 Elections (2006).
 Sabato, Larry J. Divided States of America: The Slash And Burn Politics of the 2004 Presidential Election (2005).
 Stempel III, Guido H. and Thomas K. Hargrove, eds. The 21st-Century Voter: Who Votes, How They Vote, and Why They Vote (2 vol. 2015).

External links

 United States Election 2004 Web Archive from the U.S. Library of Congress

 
2004